Natalie Anne Ward (born 24 December 1975) is a former softball player from Australia, who won bronze medals at the 1996 Summer Olympics, the 2000 Summer Olympics and the 2008 Summer Olympics. Ward also won a silver medal at the 2004 Summer Olympics. She played shortstop and 2nd base. She wore jersey number six.

Ward was born in Newcastle, New South Wales. By 2006, she had appeared in 357 games for the Australian national team. That broke the former record of 356 games held by Sally McCreedy. Ward played in the 2008 Olympic Games, her fourth Olympics.
Ward retired from the sport following these Olympics because of the IOC's decision to not allow softball into the next two Olympiads.

References

 Profile

1975 births
Living people
Australian Institute of Sport softball players
Australian softball players
Olympic softball players of Australia
Softball players at the 1996 Summer Olympics
Softball players at the 2000 Summer Olympics
Softball players at the 2004 Summer Olympics
Softball players at the 2008 Summer Olympics
Olympic silver medalists for Australia
Olympic bronze medalists for Australia
People from New South Wales
Olympic medalists in softball
Medalists at the 2008 Summer Olympics
Medalists at the 2004 Summer Olympics
Medalists at the 2000 Summer Olympics
Medalists at the 1996 Summer Olympics